Callum Crawford (born November 7, 1984) is a Canadian lacrosse player who plays for Panther City Lacrosse Club in the National Lacrosse League. He has played for the Edmonton Rush, Calgary Roughnecks, San Jose Stealth, and the Chicago Shamrox during his career. He is also the founder of the Ottawa Capitals Lacrosse club.

Heading into the 2023 NLL season, Inside Lacrosse ranked Crawford the #6 best forward in the NLL.

Statistics

NLL
Reference:

MLL

References

External links
 Ottawa Capitals Website
 Professional statistics via statscrew.com

1984 births
Living people
Canadian lacrosse players
Edmonton Rush players
Lacrosse forwards
Lacrosse people from Ontario
Minnesota Swarm players
Georgia Swarm players
San Jose Stealth players
Premier Lacrosse League players
Sportspeople from Ottawa